old man was a bimonthly magazine published by the Union of Swiss Short Wave Amateurs as the membership journal of the organization. After the end of old man in 2007 its since recontinued as HBradio.

The magazine covers topics related to amateur radio. The magazine is published with articles in three languages: German, Italian, and French. The magazine drew and draws its subscription base primarily from Switzerland. The journal was published in A5 paper size with a full color cover and black-and-white print on un-coated newsprint inside. The final issue of old man was published in November/December 2007, after which the organization discontinued publication in favor of a new membership journal called HBradio.

References

1932 establishments in Switzerland
2007 disestablishments in Switzerland
Amateur radio magazines
Bi-monthly magazines published in Switzerland
Defunct magazines published in Switzerland
Hobby magazines
Magazines established in 1932
Magazines disestablished in 2007
Multilingual magazines